Jawoyn (Jawonj, Jawany, Djauan, Jawan, Jawony; Adowen, Gun-djawan), also known as Kumertuo, is an endangered Gunwinyguan language spoken by elders in Arnhem Land, Australia.

References

External links 
 ELAR archive of Jawoyn

Gunwinyguan languages
Indigenous Australian languages in the Northern Territory